Maria Carlota "Lota" Costallat de Macedo Soares (16 March 1910 – 25 September 1967) was a well-connected Brazilian woman who became a well-known landscape designer and architect. Despite not having a degree in either area,  she was invited by governor Carlos Lacerda to design and oversee the construction of Flamengo Park in Rio de Janeiro. She was born in Paris, France into a prominent political family from Rio de Janeiro.

Biography
Lota, as she was known, had a relationship with the American poet Elizabeth Bishop from 1951 to 1967.  Bishop dedicated her 1965 volume of poems Questions of Travel to her. Their relationship is depicted in the Brazilian film Reaching for the Moon, based on the book Flores Raras e Banalíssimas (in English, Rare and Commonplace Flowers), by Carmen Lucia de Oliveira, as well as in the book The More I Owe You, by American author Michael Sledge.

In 1967, Soares joined Bishop in New York City after a period of extensive hospitalization for a nervous breakdown. The same day she arrived in New York, 19 September 1967, Soares took an overdose of tranquilizers. It is believed the problems with her work and her failing relationship with Bishop were what led to her suicide. She died several days later.

Tribute
On March 16, 2017, Google celebrated her 107th birthday with a Google Doodle.

See also
Flamengo Park
Elizabeth Bishop

References

Further reading

 Lloyd Schwartz, "Elizabeth Bishop and Brazil," The New Yorker, September 30, 1991
 Brett Millier, Elizabeth Bishop: Life and the Memory of It, University of California Press, 1995
 Elizabeth Bishop, One Art: Letters. Ed. Robert Giroux (New York: Farrar, Straus, Giroux, 1994). 
 Carmen L. Oliveira, Rare and Commonplace Flowers: The Story of Elizabeth Bishop and Lota de Macedo Soares, translated by Neil K. Besner, (Rutgers University Press, 2002); reviewed by Emily Nussbaum 
 Schuma Schumacher and Érico Vital Brasil, eds. Dicionário Mulheres do Brasil (Rio de Janeiro: Jorge Zahar Editora, 2000), pp. 335–336.
 Michael Sledge, "The More I Owe You." (Berkeley: Counterpoint Press, 2010).

1910 births
1967 deaths
French people of Brazilian descent
People from Rio de Janeiro (city)
Brazilian architects
Brazilian women architects
Brazilian LGBT artists
LGBT architects
1967 suicides
20th-century Brazilian LGBT people
Brazilian expatriates in France
Brazilian expatriates in the United States